Roßleben is a town and a former municipality in the Kyffhäuserkreis district, with a population of 4,885 (2017). It is located in Thuringia, Germany. Since 1 January 2019, it is part of the town Roßleben-Wiehe. It is situated on the river Unstrut, 22 km southeast of Sangerhausen.

Population development

From 1999 with districts

Data source: Statistical office Thuringia

Sons and daughters of the town

 Fritz Hofmann, (1871-1927), athlete, sprinter, winner of the first medal for Germany at the Olympic Games 1896 in Athens
 Hugo Launicke, (1909-1975), antifascist and SED politician.
 Werner Heine (born 1935), footballer
 Richard Hüttig (1908-1934), communist, hanged on June 14, 1934 in Berlin-Plötzensee
Johannes Steinhoff (1913-1994), fighter pilot in the Second World War, general and inspector of the Luftwaffe in the Federal Republic of Germany

References

Towns in Thuringia
Former municipalities in Thuringia
Kyffhäuserkreis